This is a list of notable people who were born or have lived in Yaroslavl, Russia.

Born in Yaroslavl

17th century

1601–1700 
 Joseph Vladimirov (active 1642–1666), Russian painter and art theorist of the 17th century

18th century

1701–1800 
 Vasily Maykov (1728–1778), Russian poet, fabulist, playwright and translator
 Ivan Dmitrevsky (1734–1821), the most influential actor of Russian Neoclassicism and "Russia's first great tragedian"
 Mikhail Popov (1742–1790), Russian writer, poet, dramatist and opera librettist
 Gerasim Lebedev (1749–1817), Russian adventurer, linguist, pioneer of Bengali theatre, translator, musician and writer
 Semyon Bobrov (1763/1765–1810), Russian poet and civil servant
 Andrei Ukhtomsky (1771–1852), Russian copper engraver
 Nikolay Mylnikov (1797–1842), Russian portrait painter

19th century

1801–1900 
 Karolina Pavlova (1807–1893), Russian poet and novelist
 Duke Peter Georgievich of Oldenburg (1812–1881), Duke of the House of Oldenburg
 Izmail Sreznevsky (1812–1880), a towering figure in 19th-century Slavic studies
 Leonid Sabaneyev (1844–1898), Russian zoologist
 Aleksandr Lyapunov (1857–1918), Russian mathematician, mechanician and physicist
 Liverij Darkshevich (1858–1925), Russian neurologist
 Sergei Lyapunov (1859–1924), Russian composer and pianist
 Konstantin Satunin (1863–1915), Russian zoologist
 Mikhail Kuzmin (1872–1936), Russian poet, musician and novelist
 Leonid Sobinov (1872–1934), Russian opera singer
 Sergey Shukalov (1883–after 1941), Soviet weapons designer
 Mikhail Sokolov (1885–1947), Russian painter, graphic artist and illustrator active in Soviet Avant-garde arts activity
 Ivan Vakhrameev (1885–1965), Russian revolutionary
 Nikolai Nevsky (1892–1937), Russian and Soviet linguist
 Mikhail Viktorov (1892–1938), Russian military leader and Commander-in-Chief of the Soviet Naval Forces

20th century

1901–1920 
 Boris Shavyrin (1902–1965), Russian artillery and rocket engineer
 Bonifaty Kedrov (1903–1985), Soviet researcher, philosopher, logician, chemist and psychologist
 Maria Prilezhayeva (1903–1989), Russian and Soviet children's author, literary critic and the Soviet Union of Writers official
 Tikhon Rabotnov (1904–2000), Russian plant ecologist
 Maria Petrovykh (1908–1979), Russian poet and translator
 Victor Rozov (1913–2004), Russian Soviet dramatist
 Yuri Lyubimov (1917–2014), Soviet and Russian stage actor and director associated with the internationally renowned Taganka Theatre, which he founded in 1964
 Yury Smyslov (1920–1991), Soviet equestrian

1921–1950 
 Aleksey Naumov (1923–1943), WWII Soviet tank commander
 Veniamin Basner (1925–1996), Russian composer
 Violetta Kiss (1925–1994), Soviet acrobat, juggler, director, and teacher
 Sergei Kalinin (born 1926), Russian sports shooter
 Viktor Danilov (born 1927), abbot of the Greek Catholic parish in Grodno
 Pavel Kolchin (1930–2010), Soviet cross-country skier
 Juvenal Poyarkov (born 1935), hierarch of the Russian Orthodox Church
 Oleg Aleksandrov (1937–1997), Soviet rower
 Viktor Carev (born 1939), Soviet sprint canoeist
 Viktor Sheinov (born 1940), Professor of Psychology and Pedagogical Proficiency
 Valery Tarakanov (born 1941), Soviet/Russian cross-country skier
 Valentin Kornev (born 1942), Soviet sport shooter
 Valery Volkov (born 1947), Soviet equestrian and Olympic champion
 Valeri Frolov (born 1949), Russian professional football coach and a former player

1951–1960 
 Alexander (Ishchein) (1952–2021), prelate, who served as the archbishop of Russian Orthodox Diocese of Baku and Azerbaijan from 1999 until his death in 2021
 Vladimir Churkin (1953–2021), Soviet and Russian football player and coach
 Volodymyr Makukha (born 1955), Ukrainian politician and diplomat
 Artemy Troitsky (born 1955), Russian journalist, music critic, concert promoter, broadcaster and an academic
 Aleksandr Pobegalov (born 1956), Russian professional football coach
 Aleksandr Petrov (born 1957), Oscar-winning Russian animator and animation director
 Nataliya Popova (born 1958), Russian former swimmer
 Yevgeni Martyanov (born 1959), Russian professional football coach and a former player

1961–1970 
 Andrei Khomutov (born 1961), Soviet ice hockey right winger
 Yevgeni Kuznetsov (born 1961), Russian professional football coach and a former player
 Sergey Shlyapnikov (born 1961), Russian volleyball coach
 Sergey Okrugin (born 1963), Russian chess International Master
 Rinad Minvaleyev (born 1965), Russian physiologist, orientalist and researcher of the traditional health cаre systems
 Yevheniya Tovstohan (born 1965), Soviet Ukrainian handball player
 Aleksei Kazalov (born 1967), Russian professional football coach and a former player
 Oleg Kiselyov (born 1967), Russian handball player
 Dmitri Popov (born 1967), Russian retired footballer
 Alex Sipiagin (born 1967), Russian jazz trumpet and flugelhorn player
 Yevgeny Urlashov (born 1967), Mayor of the city of Yaroslavl between April 2012 and July 2013
 Tatyana Babashkina (born 1968), Russian high jumper
 Alexei Chistyakov (born 1968), Russian ice hockey coach and former professional player
 Svitlana Kashchenko (born 1968), Russian-born Nicaraguan sport shooter
 Vadim Pomazov (born 1968), Russian football player
 Andrei Kruchin (born 1970), Russian football player
 Vyacheslav Solovyov (1970–2008), Russian serial killer and poisoner
 Maksim Tarasov (born 1970), Russian Olympic pole vaulter

1971–1980 
 Anna Malova (born 1971), Russian beauty queen, model and physician who was crowned Miss Russia 1998
 Igor Varlamov (born 1971), Russian footballer
 Andrei Zhirov (born 1971), Russian professional football coach and a former player
 Vladimir Zhukov (born 1972), Russian serial killer, rapist and pedophile
 Sergei Bulavin (born 1973), Russian football player
 Andrei Galyanov (born 1973), Russian professional footballer
 Theodore (Kazanov) (born 1973), Metropolitan of the Russian Orthodox Church
 Aleksey Kostygov (born 1973), Russian handball player
 Andrey Zadorozhniy (born 1973), Russian middle distance runner
 Galimdzhan Khayrulin (born 1974), Russian football manager and a former player
 Aleksei Klestov (born 1974), Russian football player
 Evgeni Ryabchikov (born 1974), Russian professional ice hockey goaltender
 Ildar Yubin (born 1974), Russian professional ice hockey player
 Aleksandr Kalinin (born 1975), Russian football coach and a former player
 Vyacheslav Lotoryov (born 1975), Russian football player
 Artyom Yenin (born 1976), Russian association football player
 Vasili Chernitsyn (born 1977), Russian professional footballer
 Ilya Gorokhov (born 1977), Russian professional ice hockey defenceman
 Alexei Vasiliev (born 1977), Russian professional ice hockey defenseman
 Pavel Korostelyov (born 1978), Russian cross-country skier
 Elena Letuchaya (born 1978), Russian journalist, television presenter, producer and director
 Vyacheslav Pozdnyakov (born 1978), Russian fencer
 Aleksey Zagornyi (born 1978), Russian hammer thrower
 Tatyana Andrianova (born 1979), Russian middle distance runner
 Mikhail Donika (born 1979), Russian ice hockey defenceman
 Elena Grosheva (born 1979), Russian Olympic gymnast
 Alexander Medvedev (born 1979), Russian professional ice hockey player
 Ivan Tkachenko (1979–2011), Russian professional ice hockey winger
 Aleksandr Chistyakov (born 1980), Russian professional football player
 Sergei Kuznetsov (born 1980), Russian ice hockey left winger
 Aleksandr Malyshev (born 1980), Russian professional footballer

1981–1990 
 Alexander Barkunov (born 1981), Russian professional ice hockey player
 Sergei Mozyakin (born 1981), Russian professional ice hockey winger
 Simon Rastorguev (born 1981), Russian architect
 Igor Yemeleyev (born 1981), Russian professional ice hockey player
 Ivan Nepryaev (born 1982), Russian ice hockey forward
 Ilya Tkachyov (born 1982), former Russian professional footballer
 Evgeny Drattsev (born 1983), Russian swimmer
 Denis Grebeshkov (born 1983), Russian professional ice hockey defenceman
 Lyudmila Postnova (born 1984), Russian team handball player
 Dmitri Utkin (born 1984), Russian professional ice hockey player
 Mikhail Biryukov (born 1985), Russian ice hockey goaltender
 Alexander Galimov (1985–2011), Russian professional ice hockey player
 Dmitri Golubev (born 1985), Russian professional footballer
 Yaroslav Kharitonskiy (born 1985), Russian professional footballer
 Viktor Myagkov (born 1985), Russian professional footballer
 Oleg Piganovich (born 1985), Russian professional ice hockey Defenseman
 Igor Shtukin (born 1985), Russian professional footballer
 Georgi Ulyanov (born 1985), Russian footballer
 Andrei Kiryukhin (1987–2011), Russian professional ice hockey winger
 Elena Kostyuchenko (born 1987), Russian journalist and gay rights activist
 Artem Anisimov (born 1988), Russian professional ice hockey center
 Mark Bluvshtein (born 1988), Soviet-born Canadian chess player
 Levan Latsuzbaya (born 1988), Russian professional football player
 Aleksandr Lazushin (born 1988), Russian professional ice hockey player
 Maxim Malyutin (born 1988), Belarusian professional ice hockey goaltender
 Alexander Vasyunov (1988–2011), Russian ice hockey player
 Ilya Davydov (born 1989), Russian professional ice hockey defenceman
 Kirill Gavrilychev (born 1989), Russian ice hockey defenceman
 Lyubov Polyanskaya (born 1989), Russian professional triathlete
 Artyom Smirnov (born 1989), Russian professional football player
 Artyom Garifullin (born 1990), Russian ice hockey player
 Mariya Koroleva (born 1990), American synchronized swimmer
 Alexander Shibaev (born 1990), Russian table tennis player
 Artem Yarchuk (1990–2011), Russian professional ice hockey winger

1991–2000 
 Ilya Burov (born 1991), Russian freestyle skier
 Vladimir Tarasenko (born 1991), Russian professional ice hockey right winger
 Yuri Urychev (1991–2011), Russian professional ice hockey player
 Maksim Bobylev (born 1992), Russian professional football player
 Pavel Krotov (born 1992), Russian freestyle skier
 Olga Meganskaya (born 1992), Russian singer and model
 Artyom Shchadin (born 1992), Russian professional football player
 Pavel Snurnitsyn (1992–2011), Russian professional ice hockey player
 Yevgeni Steshin (born 1992), Russian professional football player
 Artyom Artemyev (born 1993), Russian ice hockey goaltender
 Feraliminal Lycanthropizer, goregrind/porngrind music group founded in 2009
 Kirill Kapustin (born 1993), Russian ice hockey player
 Maxim Osipov (born 1993), Russian ice hockey defenceman
 Mikhail Zemskov (born 1994), Russian professional football player
 Dmitri Belov (born 1995), Russian football player
 Vladislav Gavrikov (born 1995), Russian ice hockey defenceman
 Nadezhda Karpova (born 1995), Russian footballer
 Anastasia Lagina (born 1995), Russian handball player
 Stanislav Nikitin (born 1995), Russian freestyle skier
 Ilya Serikov (born 1995), Russian football player
 Igor Zolotovskiy (born 1995), Russian football player
 Pavel Kraskovsky (born 1996), Russian ice hockey player
 Vladislav Labzin (born 1996), Russian football player
 Alexander Yelesin (born 1996), Russian professional ice hockey defenceman
 Arsen Ayrapetyan (born 1997), Russian football player
 Anton Betyuzhnov (born 1997), Russian football player
 Anastasiia Galashina (born 1997), Russian sport shooter
 Pavel Kudryavtsev (born 1997), Russian professional ice hockey player
 Ivan Provorov (born 1997), Russian junior ice hockey defenseman
 Mikhail Sidorov (born 1997), Russian professional ice hockey defenceman
 Nikolai Vovk (born 1997), Russian football player
 Maxim Burov (born 1998), Russian male freestyle skier
 Ilya Konovalov (born 1998), Russian ice hockey goaltender
 Aleksei Gerasimov (born 1999), Russian football player
 Liubov Nikitina (born 1999), Russian freestyle skier
 Ekaterina Zelenkova (born 1999), Russian female handballer
 Maxim Denezhkin (born 2000), Russian professional ice hockey forward

21st century

2001–2100 
 Igor Maslennikov (born 2001), Russian football player
 Karina Metelkova (born 2003), Russian group rhythmic gymnast
 Vitali Shitov (born 2003), Russian football player
 Vladislav Shitov (born 2003), Russian football player

Lived in Yaroslavl 
 Vasili, Prince of Yaroslavl (died 1345), prince of the Principality of Yaroslavl from 1321 to 1345
 Fyodor Volkov (1729–1763), founder of the first Russian theater
 Nikolay Nekrasov (1821–1878), Russian poet
 Konstantin Ushinsky (1824–1871), Russian teacher and writer, founder of Russian pedagogics
 Aleksandr Lyapunov (1857–1918), Russian mathematician, mechanician and physicist
 Valentina Tereshkova (born 1937), Russian cosmonaut and politician; the first woman in space

See also 

 List of Russian people
 List of Russian-language poets

External links 
 Известные ярославцы 
 Самые известные ярославцы 
 Знаменитые ярославцы 

Yaroslavl